Ollie Murray James (July 27, 1871August 28, 1918) was an American politician. A Democrat, he represented Kentucky in the United States House of Representatives and the United States Senate.

Biography
James was born and raised in western Kentucky.  As a teenager he served as a page in the Kentucky General Assembly.  James studied law and was admitted to the bar in 1891, beginning his practice that year.

In 1902 James sought and won election to the United States House of Representatives from Kentucky's 1st district, the far western part of the state.  He was re-elected to the House four times, serving there from March 4, 1903 to March 3, 1913.  He was the Chairman of the Democratic National Conventions of 1912 and 1916.

In 1912 James decided to give up his House seat to seek election to the United States Senate.  He won that election in the Kentucky state legislature on 9 and 16 January 1912 and was sworn in on March 4, 1913.  He served as chairman of the Senate Committee on Patents.  He died during his term of office in a hospital in Baltimore, Maryland on August 28, 1918.

He was buried in Mapleview Cemetery in Marion, Kentucky.

See also
List of United States Congress members who died in office (1900–49)

References

 Ollie M. James, late a representative from Kentucky, Memorial addresses delivered in the House of Representatives and Senate frontispiece 1920

External links

Candidates in the 1912 United States presidential election
20th-century American politicians
1871 births
1918 deaths
Democratic Party United States senators from Kentucky
Democratic Party members of the United States House of Representatives from Kentucky
People from Marion, Kentucky
19th-century American politicians